Michael Hill International Ltd. is a speciality retailer of jewellery in North America and Oceania. As at 30 June 2018, it operates 312 stores in Australia, New Zealand and Canada. The Group employs approximately 2,600 permanent employees. The company's headquarters are in Brisbane, Australia.

There are 55 Michael Hill stores in New Zealand, including 17 in Auckland.

History

The company started in 1979, when Michael Hill and his wife, Christine, opened their first store in the New Zealand town of Whangarei. A unique retail jewellery formula that included dramatically different store designs, a product range devoted exclusively to jewellery and almost saturation levels of high impact advertising elevated the company to national prominence. The company also received several international awards for window-dressing from renowned brands such as Bulova, Olympic and Omega.

The company grew steadily, expanding to 10 stores by 1987, the same year it listed on the NZX. Also in this year, Michael Hill Jeweller expanded into Australia, opening four stores in four weeks.

In 2000, Michael Hill Jeweller had 40 stores in New Zealand, including 12 in Auckland.

In 2002, the company expanded into Canada, opening its first stores in Vancouver, British Columbia. Michael Hill now has a presence in five Canadian provinces: British Columbia, Alberta, Saskatchewan, Manitoba and Ontario. In September 2008, the company entered the United States market by acquiring 17 stores in Illinois and Missouri from Whitehall Jewelers. By mid-2013 over 60% of overall sales were from Australia, only 20% from New Zealand, with the rest from North America.

Emma Hill, the daughter of Michael Hill, succeeded him as chairperson after the November 2015 annual general meeting.

In April 2018 they closed the 9 remaining stores in the USA.

Michael Hill watches

In late 2006, following a five-year trial, the company launched its own brand of watches under the Michael Hill name, phasing out all but the Citizen brand of watches by the middle of 2007. By mid-2008, only Michael Hill-brand watches were available in the company's stores.

Timeline

 1979: Michael Hill opens his first store in Whangarei, New Zealand
 1981: Michael Hill began manufacturing his own jewellery in house.
 2006: The Michael Hill Watch Collection was launched.
 2009: The Michael Hill Charms Collection was launched.
 2010: Michael Hill announced the closure of 8 stores in the United States.
 The company announced it was in a $40m NZD dispute with the Australian Taxation Office.
 2013: Michael Hill announced a new global brand, including bridal products and other jewellery which was more feminine.
 2014: Sales in Australia were described as "lacklustre" due to Australian economic performance. The company settled its dispute with the Australian Taxation Office.
 2015: The company opened a store in New York City in April 2015. Australian sales improve after poor performance in that market during 2013–2014. Sir Michael Hill moved to a new role of Founder/President, as his daughter Emma became Chairman.

References

External links
 Michael Hill Jeweller
 Michael Hill Jeweller listing on the New Zealand Stock Exchange

Jewellery retailers of New Zealand
Jewellery retailers of Australia
Jewellery retailers of Canada
Companies listed on the New Zealand Exchange
New Zealand companies established in 1979
Retail companies established in 1979
Companies based in Brisbane